Mississippi Highway 619 (MS 619), also known as USS Vicksburg Way, is a  north–south unsigned state highway in Jackson County in the Mississippi Gulf Coast region of Mississippi. It connects the site of the former Naval Station Pascagoula (now Coast Guard Station Pascagoula) with both the Port of Pascagoula and the city of Pascagoula. MS 619 is the only road access to Singing River Island.

Route description

MS 619 begins on Singing River Island at the main gate of the former Naval Station Pascagoula (now Coast Guard Station Pascagoula). It heads west for a couple hundred feet before crossing a nearly  bridge over Pascagoula Bay, which first curves northward for the majority of the span before curving eastward. The highway now crosses onto the mainland for only a  before coming to an end at an intersection with MS 617 (Jerry St. Pé Highway) at the northern end of the Port of Pascagoula.

The entire length of Mississippi Highway 619 is a two-lane highway, with a  speed limit.

History
MS 619 was originally opened in 1989, coinciding with the completion of the new Naval Station Pascagoula. The route was signed as USS Vicksburg Way in April 1993. While the base closed in 2006 (though has been converted to Coast Guard Station Pascagoula), the highway still exists and is open to traffic, serving as the only road access to Singing River Island.

Major intersections

References

External links

619
Transportation in Jackson County, Mississippi